Builders of Egypt is an upcoming economic type of city-building game taking place in Ancient Egypt. The story will start in a little-known protodynastic period. The player will be able to observe the birth of Egyptian Civilization and the game will finish with the fall of the Ptolemaic Kingdom and Cleopatra's death.

Builders of Egypt: Prologue, a demo version, was released on 2 March 2020.

Gameplay
Builders of Egypt is expected to have similarities with previous city-building games by Impressions Games' set in Ancient Egypt: Pharaoh and its spiritual successor, Immortal Cities: Children of the Nile.

References

External links
Official website
Strategy Labs

Upcoming video games
City-building games
Video games developed in Poland
Video games set in antiquity
Video games set in Egypt
Video games set in Sudan
Video games featuring female protagonists
Video games with isometric graphics
Windows games
Windows-only games
Single-player video games
PlayWay games
CreativeForge Games games